John Patrick Mitchell (18 September 1924 – 29 December 1978) was an Australian rules footballer who played with Melbourne in the Victorian Football League (VFL).

Notes

External links 

1924 births
Australian rules footballers from Victoria (Australia)
Melbourne Football Club players
Sale Football Club players
1978 deaths
People from Yarra Ranges